The Monument Airport , a.k.a. Phosphate Hill Airport is located at Phosphate Hill, Queensland, Australia.

See also
 List of airports in Queensland

References

Airports in Queensland